Lesbian, gay, bisexual, and transgender (LGBT) persons in Papua New Guinea face legal challenges not experienced by non-LGBT residents. Male same-sex sexual activity is illegal, punishable by up to 14 years' imprisonment, but the law is not enforced.

Attitudes towards LGBT people are greatly influenced by Christian churches, as a majority of Papua New Guineans are Christian. Historically, gay men had certain societal roles. They would take on traditional female roles such as cooking and would participate with women in traditional festivals. However, some tribes were observed to have practiced ritual homosexuality such as the Etoro people and Sambia people.

Nowadays, LGBT people tend to be more tolerated and accepted in coastal areas than in the New Guinea Highlands.

Terminology
The words "lesbian", "gay", "bisexual" and "transgender" tend to carry heavy stigma in Papua New Guinea.

In recent years, the Tok Pisin word  has been used by transgender Papua New Guineas to refer to a cultural and traditional third gender. Similarly, the Sambia people recognize a traditional third gender: kwolu-aatmwol (literally male thing transforming into female thing).

Legality of same-sex sexual activity
Male same-sex sexual activity is prohibited by Section 210 of the Papua New Guinea Penal Code. Anal sex and oral sex between persons of the opposite sex is also illegal. Those caught engaging in anal sex or oral sex (whether heterosexual or homosexual) can be punished with up to fourteen years' imprisonment. Other same-sex sexual acts can be punished with up to three years' imprisonment. In 2011, the Government informed the United Nations that decriminalising homosexuality was not a priority.

According to the United States Department of State, there were no reports of prosecutions in 2012 directed at LGBT persons. However, the department reported that LGBT persons in 2012 were "vulnerable to societal stigmatization".

Former MP Dame Carol Kidu in 2012 described gay Papua New Guineans as being forced to live lives of secrecy, and called unsuccessfully on the Government to decriminalise homosexuality. Prime Minister Peter O'Neill explained that there were "strong feelings" against homosexuality in the country, which was "yet to accept such sexual openness".

Living conditions
LGBT persons have reported facing "discrimination in their daily lives, and often struggle to find jobs".

There are a few nightclubs in Port Moresby that have "gay nights" and small drag parties, mainly in Hanuabada, which has been described as a "gay village" and a sanctuary for local LGBT people.

Summary table

See also

Human rights in Papua New Guinea
LGBT rights in Oceania

Tribes:
Etoro people, a PNG tribe with traditional homosexual rituals
Sambia people, a PNG tribe with traditional homosexual rituals
Kaluli people, a PNG tribe with traditional homosexual rituals

References

Human rights in Papua New Guinea
Political movements in Papua New Guinea
 
Law of Papua New Guinea
Papua New Guinea